Cherokee is an open-source cross-platform web server that runs on Linux, BSD variants, Solaris, and Windows. It is a lightweight, high-performance web server/reverse proxy licensed under the GNU General Public License. Its goal is to be fast and fully functional yet still light. Major features of Cherokee include a graphical administration interface named cherokee-admin, and a modular light-weight design.

Independent tests have shown Cherokee to be better performing than Apache when serving up both static and dynamic content.

Cherokee is maintained and developed by an open source community.

Features

Web server features 
 TLS and SSL
 Virtual servers
 URL rewriting and redirections supporting regular expressions
 Authentication via htdigest, htpasswd, LDAP, MySQL, PAM, plain, and fixed list.
 Reverse HTTP proxy
 HTTP load balancing
 Traffic shaping
 Custom and Apache compatible log format.
 Ability to launch web applications on demand
 Audio/video streaming
 On the fly gzip and deflate compressions
 Resilient to the 10000 simultaneous connections barrier
 Server Side Includes (SSI)
 CGI
 FastCGI
 SCGI
 uWSGI support 
 chroot support
 RRDtool statistics
 Database bridging and sharding (DBSlayer-like)
 Graphical configuration interface
 Point & click deployments through an application market

Web applications 
Configuration wizards are provided to automatically configure the web server to perform specific tasks, or run frameworks and applications. These provide support for: PHP through FastCGI, Ruby on Rails, ColdFusion, GlassFish, Django, Alfresco, GNU Mailman, .NET with Mono, rTorrent, Symfony, and Zend Engine, plus generic Video Streaming and uWSGI.

Devices running Cherokee 
During the last few years Cherokee has been adopted by numerous electronic device makes and IoT technology manufacturers. Some examples include GoPro action cameras and drones, Xiaomi action cameras, Digi International's Internet of things kits, ATN Corporation's high-end rifle scopes, Defender's security cameras, etc. Since Cherokee is Open Source Software and does not require manufacturers to license the code, there is no way to know how many companies are embedding Cherokee in their products.

See also 
 Comparison of web servers
 Traffic Server
 Web accelerator which discusses host-based HTTP acceleration
 Proxy server which discusses client-side proxies
 Reverse proxy which discusses origin-side proxies

References

External links 
 
 Documentation
 
 Book on Cherokee

Web server software
Free web server software
Web server software for Linux
Free software programmed in C